The men's shot put at the 2022 World Athletics Indoor Championships took place on 19 March 2022.

Results
The final was started at 19:25.

References

Shot put
Shot put at the World Athletics Indoor Championships